The Pulaski County School District is a public school district in Pulaski County, Georgia, United States, based in Hawkinsville. It serves the communities of Hartford and Hawkinsville.

Schools
The Pulaski County School District has one elementary school, one middle school, and one high school.
Pulaski County Elementary School
Pulaski County Middle School
Hawkinsville High School

References

External links

School districts in Georgia (U.S. state)
Education in Pulaski County, Georgia